Transnet National Ports Authority (TNPA) is a government corporation of South Africa and a subsidiary of Transnet, responsible for managing and governing eight of South Africa's major seaports.  TNPA is a landlord authority responsible for the master planning, controlling of port navigations, controlling of port services & facilities and marketing of the port. Another division of Transnet, Transnet Port Terminals (SAPO), is responsible for terminal operations and cargo handling. TNPA's main offices are located at Braamfontein.

See also
 Transport in South Africa

References

External links
 Transnet National Port Authority official site at Transnet

Transnet
South Africa